"Light in Your Eyes" is a song by Sheryl Crow from her album The Very Best of Sheryl Crow. The phrase or similar ones may also refer to:
"Light in Your Eyes", a song by Blessid Union of Souls from their self-titled album
"Light in Your Eyes", a song by Gotthard from their album Homerun
"The Light in Your Eyes", a song by LeAnn Rimes from her album Blue
The Light in Your Eyes, a South Korean television series